NGC 422 is an open cluster located in the constellation Tucana. It was discovered on September 21, 1835 by John Herschel. It was described by Dreyer as "very faint (in Nubecular Minor).", with Nubecular Minor being the Small Magellanic Cloud. It was also described by DeLisle Stewart as "only 3 extremely faint stars, close together, not a nebula."

References

External links
 

0422
18350921
Tucana (constellation)
Open clusters
Small Magellanic Cloud